Lophostachys is a genus of plants in the family Acanthaceae.

Selected species
Lophostachys cyanea 
Lophostachys falcata
Lophostachys floribunda
Lophostachys laxiflora
Lophostachys montana
Lophostachys sessiliflora
Lophostachys villosa

 
Acanthaceae genera